Osborn's key mouse (Clidomys osborni), also known as the larger Jamaican giant hutia, is a now extinct species of large rodent in the family Heptaxodontidae. It was found on the island of Jamaica and likely became extinct before the end of the Pleistocene. Osborn's key mouse has only been found in six caves: Wallingford Roadside Cave, Sheep Pen Cave, Molton Fissure, Worthy Park Cave 1, Luidas Vale Cave, and Slue's Cave.

Synonyms
Clidomys parvus was thought to be a smaller and separate species from C. osborni but later investigation has shown that they may belong to the same species. The distinction is thought to have originated from the examination of juvenile specimens of C. osborni. This was concluded by examination of the teeth. So it seems that it is very likely the C. osborni is the only valid species of Clidomys present in Jamaica.

References

Heptaxodontidae
Pleistocene extinctions
Extinct animals of Jamaica